Blackwater Township is an inactive township in Saline County, in the U.S. state of Missouri.

Blackwater Township was erected in 1825, taking its name from the Blackwater River.

References

Townships in Missouri
Townships in Saline County, Missouri
1825 establishments in Missouri